The Walker-Broderick House, also known as the "Doc" Walker House, is a historic house at 541 Pine Street in Ketchikan, Alaska. It was listed on the National Register of Historic Places in 1982. The house is a single-story wood-frame structure, built in 1916-20 by local Ketchikan master builder Carl Foss. The house is an excellent local example of Craftsman styling, with broad eaves supported by large knee arches, large brick piers supporting the front porch, and a matching brick chimney on the side. Interior woodwork is well-preserved. The house was built for Norman "Doc" Walker, an early Ketchikan resident, pharmacist, and politician who served as mayor and in the Alaska Territorial Senate

See also
First Lutheran Church (Ketchikan, Alaska), also built by Carl Foss and NRHP-listed
National Register of Historic Places listings in Ketchikan Gateway Borough, Alaska
Similarity to the Belmont model by Sears Roebuck

References

1920 establishments in Alaska
Bungalow architecture in Alaska
Houses completed in 1920
Houses in Ketchikan Gateway Borough, Alaska
Houses on the National Register of Historic Places in Alaska
Ketchikan, Alaska
Buildings and structures on the National Register of Historic Places in Ketchikan Gateway Borough, Alaska